The St. Louis Derby run at Fairmount Park Racetrack in Collinsville, Illinois held its inaugural race on August 26, 2006.  Open to three-year-old thoroughbred horses of either gender, and run at one and one sixteenth miles on the dirt, this ungraded stakes race offers a purse of $250,000, funded privately by local business men.

Inaugurated in 1926, the race was called the Fairmount Derby. It ran until 1930 after which it did not return until 1967 and for a time achieved Grade III status. It was last run in 2006.

Past winners

 2022 - Rattle N Roll
 2021 - Flash of Mischief
 2007 through 2020 - NOT RUN
 2006 - Lawyer Ron
 1996 through 2005 - NOT RUN 
 1995 - Strawberry Wine 
 1994 - Silver Goblin (Millionaire Oklahoma-Bred stakes winner.)  	  	 	 
 1993 - Adhocracy 
 1992 - Count The Time 		  	  	 	 
 1991 - Discover 	 	 	 
 1989 - Andover Man 	 
 1988 - Primal (Millionaire stakes winner, including Grade I Donn Handicap.)	
 1987 - Parochial 		  	  	 	 
 1986 - Goshen Store 	 	  	 	 
 1985 - Smile  (Millionaire and American Champion Sprint Horse, 1986.) (Clever Allemont, winner of the 1985 Rebel Stakes and Southwest Stakes, came in third.  In 2008, 26-year-old Clever Allemont was rescued from slaughter.)
 1984 - Big Pistol (stakes winner of Grade I Haskell Invitational Handicap.)	  	  	 	 
 1983 - Hail to Rome		  	  	 	 
 1982 - Northern Majesty 		  	  	 	 
 1981 - Pocket Zipper (stakes winner of Grade I American Derby.)		  	  	 	 
 1970 - Robin's Bug (Maryland Horse of the Year, 1970.)	  	  	 	 
 1969 - Barely Once (Illinois Horse of the Year, 1970.) 		  	  	 	 
 1968 - Blarney Kiss 
 1967 - English Muffin
 Discontinued for 37 years 	  	 	 
 1930 - Gallant Knight (stakes winner of Latonia Derby, 2nd in Kentucky Derby.)
 1929 - Karl Eitel  	  	 	 
 1928 - Misstep (stakes winner of the Arlington Handicap, 2nd in Kentucky Derby.)	  	 	 
 1927 - Buddy Bauer (Kentucky Derby winner Whiskery finished second.)	  	 	 
 1926 - Haste (stakes winner of the Withers Stakes.)

External links
 Fairmount Park

Horse races in the United States
Flat horse races for three-year-olds